Theodoros Kotakos (born 10 April 1976) is a Greek boxer. He competed in the men's welterweight event at the 2004 Summer Olympics.

References

1976 births
Living people
Greek male boxers
Olympic boxers of Greece
Boxers at the 2004 Summer Olympics
Place of birth missing (living people)
Mediterranean Games bronze medalists for Greece
Mediterranean Games medalists in boxing
Competitors at the 1997 Mediterranean Games
Welterweight boxers
20th-century Greek people
21st-century Greek people